Dr. Julie Nagam is a scholar, artist, and curator based in Winnipeg, Canada.

Education 
Nagam has a BA (Honours) in Women Studies and Art History and an MA in Native Studies from the University of Manitoba. She then pursued a PhD in Social and Political Thought from York University. Her thesis “Alternative Cartographies: Grafting a New Route for Indigenous Stories of Place” was published in 2011.

Career 
Nagam's academic career began in 2009 at OCAD University where she worked as an Assistant Professor in Indigenous Visual Culture. In 2015, Nagam accepted a position as Associate Professor in the Department of History at the University of Winnipeg. Between 2015-2019 Nagam was the Research Chair of Indigenous Arts of North America, jointly appointed by the Winnipeg Art Gallery and the University of Winnipeg. In 2019 Nagam was awarded a Canada Research Chair in Indigenous Arts, Collaboration and Digital Media. Nagam is the Director of the Aabijijiwan New Media Lab and the Co-Director of the Kishaadigeh Collaborative Research Centre. She has been an adjunct faculty member at York University, University of Manitoba, and OCAD University. She has been a scholar in residence at Concordia University and Massey University.

In 2019 it was announced that Nagam would be Nuit Blanche Toronto’s inaugural Artistic Director for the years 2020-21.

Research activities 
Nagam’s research focuses largely on Indigenous art and curatorial practices, theory, and methodologies. She is especially interested in public, digital, and new media art. She is a member of the GLAM Collective.

Nagam is leading the partnership "The space between us: Collaborations within Indigenous, Circumpolar and Pacific places through digital media", funded by the Social Sciences and Humanities Research Council.

Edited journals, books and catalogues 

 Nagam, Julie, Carly Lane, and Megan Tamati-Quenell, eds. Becoming Our Future: Global Indigenous Curatorial Practice. ARP Books, 2020
 Locating the Little Heartbeats. Julie Nagam solo exhibition. Winnipeg: Gallery C103, 2019. With a curatorial essay by Niigaan Sinclair
 the future is in the land. Julie Nagam solo exhibition. Toronto: A-Space Gallery, 2018. With a curatorial essay by Cheryl L’Hirondelle
 Nagam, Julie and Jaimie Issac, eds. INSURGENCE/RESURGENCE. Winnipeg: Winnipeg Art Gallery, 2017
 Nagam, Julie, Carla Taunton, and Heather Igloliorte, eds. PUBLIC Art, Culture, Ideas 54: Indigenous Art. Winter 2016

Articles and chapters 

 Nagam, Julie and Carla Taunton. “Performing Memory: Embodied Interventions by Indigenous Women Artists.” In Insiders/Outsiders: The Cultural Politics and Ethics of Indigenous Representation and Participation in Canada’s Media Arts, edited by Dana Claxton and Ezra Winton. Waterloo: Wilfrid Laurier University Press, 2019
 Nagam, Julie. “Disruption Toronto’s Urban Space Through the Creative (In)terventions of Robert Houle.” In Εικόνα Visual Studies Vol 1. Mexico City: SIMO Cultura, 2019.
 Nagan, Julie. “Traveling Soles: Tracing the Footprints of Our Stolen Sisters.” In Canadian Voices on Performance Studies/Theory, edited by Laura Levin and Marlis Schweitzer. Montreal: McGill-Queens Press, 2017.
 Nagam, Julie. “Deciphering the Digital and Binary Codes of Sovereignty/Self-Determination and Recognition/Emancipation.” PUBLIC Art, Culture, Ideas 54: Indigenous Art. Edited by Heather Igloliorte, Julie Nagam, and Carla Taunton (Winter 2016).
 Nagam, Julie, Heather Igloliorte, and Carla Taunton. “Transmissions: The Future Possibilities of Indigenous Digital and New Media Art.” PUBLIC Art, Culture, Ideas 54: Indigenous Art. Edited by Heather Igloliorte, Julie Nagam, and Carla Taunton (Winter 2016).
 Nagam, Julie. “Mapping Stories of Place: An Alternative Cartography Through the Visual Narrative of Jeff Thomas.” In Diverse Spaces: Examining Identity, Heritage, and Community Within Canadian Public Culture, edited by Susan Ashley. New York: Cambridge Scholars Press, 2013.
Nagam, Julie. “(Re)Mapping the Colonized Body: The Creative Interventions of Rebecca Belmore in the Cityscape.” American Indian Culture and Research Journal 35, no. 4 (2011): 147–166. 
Nagam, Julie. “Transforming & Grappling with Concepts of Activism and Feminism with Indigenous Women Artists.” Atlantis: A Women Studies Journal (Halifax: Mount Saint Vincent University, 2008).

Curatorial practice 
Nagam has an active curatorial practice that often overlaps with her scholarly research. In 2017, she co-curated the exhibition INSURGENCE/RESURGENCE which was the Winnipeg Art Gallery’s largest ever exhibition of contemporary Indigenous art featuring works by 29 artists. She has worked with The Forks and the Winnipeg Foundation to curate a public art installation at Niizhoziibean.

Nuit Blanche Toronto 
Nagam is currently working on a 2-year curatorial project “The Space Between Us” as the inaugural Artistic Director for Nuit Blanche Toronto. This curatorial theme "focuses on the connections across urban, polar and pacific landscapes revealing the space between us as a potential site for sharing knowledges."

GLAM Collective 
Nagam is a member of GLAM Collective, a group of scholars who work collaboratively “through theory, curatorial and artistic practices.” With GLAM, Nagam co-curated a series of digital and new media incubators (Memory Keepers I, II, and III) for Indigenous artists, resulting in the installation of works at three Canadian night festivals in 2019. That same year, she also co-curated gathering across moana with GLAM Collective. The exhibition brought together artists from the Pacific and Turtle Islands and was presented at Trinity Square Video in Toronto, Canada.

Artistic practice 
Nagam has exhibited her work internationally, including in Canada, United States, Brazil, France, New Zealand, and England. In 2019, her solo exhibition locating the little heartbeats was shown at Gallery 1C03 in Winnipeg and travelled to Te Whare Hera in Wellington, New Zealand. Nagam’s work our future is in the land: if we listen to it was exhibited in the 2017 group show Transformers at the Smithsonian Museum in New York. She has presented works at Nuit Blanche Toronto and has received public art commissions.

References 

Year of birth missing (living people)
Living people
University of Manitoba alumni
Academic staff of the University of Manitoba
York University alumni
Canadian women curators